Events from the year 1865 in Michigan.

Office holders

State office holders
 Governor of Michigan: Henry H. Crapo 
 Lieutenant Governor of Michigan: Ebenezer O. Grosvenor
 Michigan Attorney General: Albert Williams
 Michigan Secretary of State: James B. Porter
 Speaker of the Michigan House of Representatives: Gilbert E. Read
 Chief Justice, Michigan Supreme Court: George Martin

Mayors of major cities

 Mayor of Detroit: Kirkland C. Barker
 Mayor of Grand Rapids: Wilder D. Foster

Federal office holders

 U.S. Senator from Michigan: Zachariah Chandler (Republican)/Isaac P. Christiancy
 U.S. Senator from Michigan: Jacob M. Howard (Republican) 
 House District 1: Fernando C. Beaman (Republican)
 House District 2: Charles Upson (Republican)
 House District 3: John W. Longyear (Republican)
 House District 4: Francis William Kellogg (Republican)/Thomas W. Ferry (Republican)
 House District 5: Augustus C. Baldwin (Democrat)/Rowland E. Trowbridge (Republican)
 House District 6: John F. Driggs (Republican)

Population

Chronology of events

January

February

March 
 March 12 - The Detroit Police Department was formed. The first uniformed officers began patrolling on May 15.
 March 25 - The Detroit Public Library opened on the second floor of the old Michigan State Capitol building in Detroit.

April
 April 9 -  Robert E. Lee surrendered his Army of Northern Virginia, bringing an end to the American Civil War.
 April 15 - Abraham Lincoln died after being shot one day earlier.
 April 16 - At the invitation Mayor Barker, an overflow crowd of Detroit residents assembled at City Hall. Resolutions were passed, including one expressing "profound sorrow" and "horror and anguish".
 April 25 - A parade in Detroit honored Pres. Lincoln.

May

June

July
 July - The Upper Peninsula miners' strike of 1865 was put down by a naval detachment from the USS Michigan, using an improvised armored train, and later with an army detachment from Chicago.

August
 August 13 - General Ulysses S. Grant visited Detroit.

September
 September 12/13 - The Colored Men's Convention met in Detroit.

October
 October 17 - The 102nd Regiment United States Colored Troops returned to Detroit and was disbanded.

November

December

Births
 March 21 - George Owen Squier, U.S. Army officer and inventor, in Dryden, Michigan
 April 13 - Grant Fellows, Michigan Attorney General (1913-1917), in Hudson Township, Lenawee County, Michigan
 June 28 - Frank Scheibeck, Major League Baseball shortstop (1887-1906), in Detroit
 July 21 - Fred M. Warner, 26th Governor of Michigan (1905-1911), in Hickling, Nottinghamshire
 November 15 - Jerome H. Remick, music publisher, in Detroit
 December 1 - Friend Richardson, Governor of California (1923-1927), in Friend's Colony, Michigan
 Date unknown - Lyster Hoxie Dewey, botanist, in Cambridge Township, Michigan

Deaths

See also
 History of Michigan
 History of Detroit

References